"Foreplay/Long Time" is a song by American rock band Boston, written by founder, leader, and multi-instrumentalist Tom Scholz. It appears on the band's 1976 self-titled debut album, and as their second single, on Epic Records in 1976. The song combines an instrumental introduction entitled, "Foreplay", with the main song "Long Time", generally played as one on the radio and listed as one track on the album. "Long Time" peaked at No. 22 on the Billboard Hot 100 the week ending March 5, 1977.  It reached the Top 10 in Canada, peaking at No. 9. The standalone "Foreplay" was released as the B-side of Boston's next single "Peace of Mind", which was released in April.

In an interview for the Best of Boston CD, Scholz said that "Foreplay" was the first song he ever recorded, and he did this on a two-track machine in his basement. Scholz also stated that it was the first piece of music he ever wrote, and that its origins go as far back as 1969.

An alternate mix of the song is available on the Epic Records Promo LP It's a Knockout. It was a sampler LP of artists that had releases coming up in 1976. This version has various differences in the mix and effects and also includes extra lyrics towards the end of the song. This version has never been available officially anywhere else.

Scholz originally sang all the vocal parts to "Long Time" in his basement during the making of the demo album, but his friend Brad Delp was invited to sing, and proved to be superior. Delp's voice is the only one heard on the 1976 studio recording. Scholz played several guitars, including lead electric guitar on "Foreplay", processed through a space pedal effect, and rhythm acoustic guitar on "Long Time". The three electric guitar solos on "Long Time" are played by Barry Goudreau.

Reception
Rolling Stone described "Foreplay/Long Time" as "a perfect marriage of Led Zeppelin and Yes that plays musical chairs with electric and acoustic sounds."  Los Angeles Times critic Robert Hilburn  said that "Foreplay" is an effective "Yes/ELP keyboard exploration." Billboard said it had similar catchiness to its predecessor Boston single "More Than a Feeling" due to its "spacey electronic fills and soaring, full bodied vocal harmonies."  Cash Box said the single "cuts out the long keyboard instrumental while leaving the meat of the song intact" and "builds through a series of hand-clapping interludes, first on acoustic, then on electric guitar."  Classic Rock critic Paul Elliott rated it as Boston's 6th greatest song.  Classic Rock History critic Brian Kachejian rated it as Boston's 3rd best song.

Personnel

"Foreplay"
 Tom Scholz – organ, clavinet, lead guitar; including "top secret space pedal effects"
 Sib Hashian – drums
 Barry Goudreau – rhythm guitar
 Fran Sheehan – bass guitar

"Long Time"
 Tom Scholz – acoustic guitar, bass guitar, organ, clavinet
 Brad Delp – vocals
 Sib Hashian – drums
 Barry Goudreau – lead and rhythm guitar

Cover versions
 Rascal Flatts played a cover version of "Foreplay/Long Time" in concert, which was released on the album Rascal Flatts LIVE.
Phish celebrated their concert at Great Woods in Mansfield, Massachusetts, by opening with "Foreplay/Long Time". They had covered a bluegrass arrangement earlier in their careers (see 11/12/94 Kent, OH), but this was the first time they played the full electric version that is heard on the album.

Charts

Weekly charts

Year-end charts

References

External links
 

1975 songs
1977 singles
Boston (band) songs
Epic Records singles
Song recordings produced by John Boylan (record producer)
Song recordings produced by Tom Scholz
Songs written by Tom Scholz